Clifford L. Williams (born April 15, 1945) is an American former professional basketball player. He played in three games for the Detroit Pistons and scored four total points.

References

1945 births
Living people
American men's basketball players
Basketball players from Detroit
Bowling Green Falcons men's basketball players
Detroit Pistons players
Shooting guards
Southwestern High School (Michigan) alumni
Undrafted National Basketball Association players